Phoenix Gleitschirmantriebe (Phoenix Paragliding Drives) was a German aircraft manufacturer based in Würselen. The company specialized in the design and manufacture of paramotors in the form of ready-to-fly aircraft for the US FAR 103 Ultralight Vehicles rules and for the European Fédération Aéronautique Internationale microlight category.

The company seems to have been founded in the early 2000s and gone out of business about 2008.

The company produced the Phoenix Skywalker line of paramotors, powered by the  Solo 210 and the  Hirth F-33 engines.  The aircraft was noted for the use of a paddle-bladed  diameter four-bladed composite propeller, which allowed the design of a smaller cage assembly which improved ground transport portability and handling on take-off and landing.

Aircraft

References

External links
Company website archives on Archive.org

Defunct aircraft manufacturers of Germany
Ultralight aircraft
Paramotors